The Gabonese Democratic Party (PDG) is the ruling and dominant political party of Gabon. Between 1968 and 1990 it was the sole legal party.

History
The party was established as the Gabonese Democratic Bloc (Bloc Démocratique Gabonais, BDG) in 1953 as a merger of the Gabonese Mixed Committee and the Gabonese Democratic Party. In the 1957 Territorial Assembly elections it won eight seats, finishing behind the Gabonese Democratic and Social Union (UDSG), which had won 14 seats. However, the BDG was able to form a coalition government with the "Entente–Defence of Gabonese Interests" list, headed by one of its members, and five independents.

The BGD and UDSG formed an alliance prior to the 1961 general elections, with BDG leader Léon M'ba as the sole presidential candidate, and a joint "National Union" list running unopposed for the National Assembly. The 1964 parliamentary elections saw the two parties run against each other, with the BDG winning 31 of the 47 seats.

The BDG was the only party to contest the 1967 general elections, with M'ba re-elected as President. M'ba died later in the year and was succeeded by Omar Bongo. On 12 March 1968 the BDG was succeeded by the Gabonese Democratic Party, which became the sole legal party. The PDG and Bongo were re-elected in one-party elections in 1973, 1980 and 1985, before constitutional amendments in May 1990 re-established the multi-party system.

The PDG retained power in the 1990 parliamentary elections, winning 63 of the 120 seats in the National Assembly. Bongo was re-elected again in 1993 with 51% of the vote. The party won 85 seats in the 1996 parliamentary elections, and Bongo was re-elected for a fifth time in 1998, with 67% of the vote. The PDG gained one seat in the 2001 parliamentary elections and Bongo was re-elected again in 2005 with 79% of the vote.

The 2006 parliamentary elections saw the PDG reduced to 82 seats, although it comfortably retained its majority and affiliated parties won a further 17 seats. Bongo died in 2009, and his son Ali Bongo Ondimba became PDG leader. He won presidential elections later in the year with 42% of the vote. The BDG won 113 seats in the 2011 parliamentary elections, which were boycotted by most of the opposition.

Congresses
On 17–21 September 1986, the PDG held its Third Ordinary Congress in Libreville; at the congress, it designated Bongo as its candidate for the single-party November 1986 presidential election.

From 1991 to 1994, the Secretary-General of the PDG was Jacques Adiahénot.

The PDG held its Ninth Ordinary Congress on 19–21 September 2008. At this congress, Faustin Boukoubi, who had been Minister of Agriculture, was elected as the party's Secretary-General; he replaced Simplice Guedet Manzela, who had previously been the Secretary-General for ten years. Also at the congress, the Standing Committee of the Political Bureau, composed of 18 members, was elected. The Standing Committee included two members from each of Gabon's nine provinces, and 15 of its 18 members were also members of the government.

PDG has several branches (or 'Federations') abroad, with the largest being in France and in the United States.

Electoral history

Presidential elections

National Assembly elections

Senate elections

See also 
 Viviane Biviga
 Raphael Mangouala
 Antoine Mboumbou Miyakou
 Pierre Sockat
 Simone Saint-Dénis

References

Political parties in Gabon
Parties of one-party systems
Political parties established in 1953
1953 establishments in Gabon